Salogo is a town in the Salogo Department of Ganzourgou Province in central Burkina Faso. The town has a population of 3,368, and is the capital of Salogo Department.

References

External links
Satellite map at Maplandia.com

Populated places in the Plateau-Central Region
Ganzourgou Province